General elections were held in British Guiana on 12 August 1957. The result was a victory for the faction of the People's Progressive Party led by Cheddi Jagan, who remained Prime Minister.

Campaign
A total of 55 candidates contested the elections, including six independents. The National Labour Front was the only party to run a candidate in every Legislative Council seat, with the two factions of the PPP both contesting 13 seats. The United Democratic Party (UDP) contested eight seats and the Guiana National Party one.

Results

Elected members

Aftermath
After the elections, the Burnhamite faction of the PPP merged with the UDP to form the People's National Congress.

References

1957 elections in South America
1957
General election
1957 elections in the British Empire